Super 400 is Joe Daley on drums, Kenny Hohman on guitar and vocals, and Lori Friday on electric bass. The band formed in 1996 in Troy NY, and quickly gained legendary status in the Capital District of New York. Super 400 has an electric and relentless approach to their live shows, intuitively blending a classic 60s-70s heavy rock vibe with contemporary melodic pop mastery to create something uniquely their own.
Tours both in the US and abroad started a chain of bootleg recordings that have been traded and coveted around the world. Their international following sold out over 20 shows across Europe on their last tour. The love affair between the band and their hometown of Troy reached a milestone when they were honored by Mayor Harry Tutunjian’s declaration of February 25, 2006 as “Super 400 Day in Troy,” coinciding with the ten-year anniversary of the band’s first jam in a Troy warehouse loft. Super 400 recorded their most recent full-length, ‘Sweet Fist’, at legendary Ardent Studios in Memphis, TN, and followed the release with their biggest US tour to date. They’ve appeared on national television in the US and abroad, written music for top-rated shows on American television, and continue to light stages with their love and intense passion
for playing. Super 400 was inducted into the Capital Region Eddies Music Hall of Fame in 2022, as well as receiving the honor of Best Rock Band.

Discography

References

 Brodeur, John  "Family Values". metroland.com. Retrieved on February 6, 2008.
 Lurie, Kathryn  "Rough Mix". metroland.com. Retrieved on February 6, 2008.
 archive.org page detailing Super 400's tape trading policy. Retrieved on February 6, 2008.

External links 
 Super 400's Official Site
 Super 400 on myspace
 Super 400's facebook page
 Super 400 on last.fm

Hard rock musical groups from New York (state)
Musicians from Troy, New York